Diskobukta is a bay at the western side of Edgeøya, Svalbard, at the eastern side of Storfjorden, Norway. The bay is a suitable anchoring site for vessels.

References

Bays of Svalbard
Edgeøya